Parirazona bomana is a species of moth of the family Tortricidae. It is found in Santa Catarina, Brazil.

The wingspan is about 15 mm small. The ground color of the forewings is white with a few pale brownish grey suffusions. The proximal half of the wing is brownish white, suffused with brownish and strigulated (finely streaked) with pale brownish. The hindwings are whitish.

Etymology
The species name refers to the type locality, Bom Jardim da Serra.

References

Moths described in 2007
Cochylini